FKB may refer to:
 The Flying Karamazov Brothers, an American performance troupe
 French King Bridge, in Massachusetts, United States
 Karlsruhe/Baden-Baden Airport, in Germany
 FKB (band), a Canadian rock band